Osgood may refer to:

Places in the United States
 Osgood, Idaho
 Osgood, Indiana
 Osgood, Iowa
 Osgood, Missouri
 Osgood, North Dakota
 Osgood, Ohio
 Osgood, West Virginia

Other uses
 Osgood (surname)
 Osgood curve, in mathematics

See also
 Osgood–Schlatter disease
 
 Osgoode (disambiguation)